The 10.75×68mm Mauser, also known as the .423 Mauser, is an obsolete rimless bottleneck centerfire rifle cartridge developed by Mauser and introduced in the early 1920s.

Overview 
The 10.75×68mm Mauser was introduced by Mauser in the early 1920s and chambered in their pre-World War II magnum sporting rifles.

The 10.75×68mm Mauser was a popular big game cartridge with African and Indian hunters, it was used successfully on all dangerous game species up to and including elephants, although many experienced hunters considered it unsuitable for the latter.

Taylor was very critical of the cartridge due to its poor sectional density and as a result poor penetration. Taylor stated the fully jacketed versions lacked the penetration for frontal headshots on elephant or shoulder shots on buffalo and the expanding bullets were inadequate on lion and eland.

One prominent user of the 10.75×68mm Mauser was Donald Anderson, son of Kenneth Anderson, who used a rifle chambering this cartridge to hunt almost all Indian dangerous game species and who stated it was far superior to his father's .405 Winchester.

See also 
 List of rifle cartridges

References

External links 
 Cartridgecollector, "10.75×68 Mauser", cartridgecollector.net, retrieved 30 March 2018.
 Load Data, "10.75×68 Mauser", loaddata.com, retrieved 30 March 2018.
 Real Guns, "The 10.75 × 68 Mauser", realguns.com, retrieved 30 March 2018.

Pistol and rifle cartridges